John C. Tune Airport  is a public airport located in the western portion of the city of Nashville in Davidson County, Tennessee, United States.  It is owned by the Metropolitan Nashville Airport Authority, located approximately one mile (1.6 km) off of Briley Parkway in the Cockrill Bend area. It is a Class D airport.

Although most U.S. airports use the same three-letter location identifier for the FAA and IATA, this airport is assigned JWN by the FAA but has no designation from the IATA.

History 
Tune Airport is named in honor of John Childress Tune, a Nashville attorney, civic leader, longtime aviation enthusiast and one of the principal developers of the modern aviation authority concept. He was also a former chairman of the Metropolitan Nashville Airport Authority. Planning for the construction of Tune Airport began in 1965 under Nashville's former Department of Aviation as a "reliever airport" designed to provide additional capacity at Nashville International Airport (Berry Field). The Department of Aviation received a state grant to purchase the Cockrill Bend property, and construction for the airport began in 1983. The airport opened in July 1986. The current terminal was built in 1995 and renovated in 2015.

On March 3, 2020, the airport suffered significant tornado damage to its terminal and other buildings, including 17 hangars on the property; more than 90 aircraft parked at the airport—including charter jets, smaller airplanes, and a newsgathering helicopter operated by CBS affiliate WTVF (channel 5)—were destroyed.

Facilities and aircraft 
It has one asphalt paved runway designated 2/20 which measures 6,001 by 100 feet (1,829. x 30 m). The runway is long enough to serve corporate jets such as Lear Jets. For the 12-month period ending March 6, 2009, the airport had 72,998 aircraft operations, an average of 199 per day: 70% general aviation, 29% air taxi and <1% military. At that time there were 165 aircraft based at this airport: 79% single-engine, 16% multi-engine, 3% jet and 2% helicopter.

Corporate Flight Management provides Fixed-Base Operator services for the airport. JWN has 120 T-hangars, plus  and  box hangars that include offices. Aircraft parking and apron space totals , which can accommodate 55 tie-down aircraft. The airport has a precision instrument landing approach into Runway 20. Both Runways 2 and 20 have non-precision instrument approaches.  

JWN is financially self-supporting, although some improvements are made with the assistance of state and federal grant money.

Services 

John C. Tune Airport provides:
 24-hour personnel service
 Avgas
 Jet fuel
 Aircraft and helicopter maintenance
 Private and commercial pilot certification
 Lasergrade testing
 Instrument rating courses
 Flight instructor certification courses
 Flight simulator training
 Helicopter pilot training
 Lavatory disposal

Renovations 
John C. Tune's terminal received a significant renovation that was completed in 2005. The  updated terminal includes a pilot's lounge, conference room, flight planning room, vending area and pilot supply shop. Additional landscaping and parking renovations were completed in 2009.

References

External links 

 John C. Tune Airport
 
 

Airports in Tennessee
Airports established in 1986
Transportation buildings and structures in Nashville, Tennessee
1986 establishments in Tennessee